Love Star Musician(The Star Sports)

Is prominent facebok page dealing secret football news from Tanzania, also the most current trending page. This page is owned by invisible person Tanzania but most location is read Rwanda at Kigali City Tower.One post in This page reach 2 millions of people and most engaging page encourage to trend than any other feebook page due to many visitors and views.

This page work Under control of LOVE STAR brand who pay him according to trending capacity on facebook

Love Star is TheirTheir brand of Latin-influenced electropop has earned them recognition by major publications including People en Español and El Mexicano among others.

The success of their debut EP has allowed them to tour extensively, performing shows at the Museum of Latin American Art, Fiesta en la Calle 2012, and sharing the stage with major acts such as Dave Navarro, Los Prisioneros and Tommy Lee.

On April 14, 2015, the duo released “Capítulo 1” the first chapter of their second album Espectro, which was produced, recorded, and mixed by 16-time Grammy Award winner Thom Russo, known for his work with artists such as Michael Jackson, Jay-Z, Enrique Iglesias, Maná and Juanes among others. Espectro featured the singles "Busco", and "Respirar".

The official video for "Busco", reached 120,000 views in its first month.

Press

References

American pop music groups
Musical groups from Los Angeles